Jamestown ( (IPA:[ˈpaləˈheːməʃ])) is a village in the Vale of Leven conurbation in West Dunbartonshire, Scotland.

Located on the east bank of the River Leven, it is sandwiched between Balloch to the north and Bonhill to the south.

It is losing its identity as a separate village, as some estate agents treat it as part of Balloch.

References

External links 

article on Vale website
Vision of Britain - Jamestown, Dunbartonshire

Villages in West Dunbartonshire
Vale of Leven